The following is a list of football stadiums in Tunisia, with a capacity of at least 5,000 spectators. Some stadiums are also used for other purposes like athletics, concerts, politics and cultural events.

Currently in use

See also
List of African stadiums by capacity
List of stadiums by capacity

References

External links
Tunisia at WorldStadiums.com

 
Tunisia
Football stadiums